The governor of Vermont is the head of government of the U.S. state of Vermont. Since 1994, Vermont is one of only two U.S. states (New Hampshire being the other) that elects governors for two-year terms. Until 1870, Vermont elected its governors for one-year terms. Isaac Tichenor, Jonas Galusha, Erastus Fairbanks, and Richard A. Snelling each served non-consecutive terms, while Thomas Chittenden served non consecutive terms as Governor of the Vermont Republic.

Mountain Rule
From the founding of the Republican Party in the 1850s until the 1960s, only Republicans won general elections for Vermont's statewide offices. One method that made this possible was the Republican Party's imposition of the "Mountain Rule," an informal mechanism which restricted the pool of candidates.

Under the provisions of the Mountain Rule, one U.S. senator was a resident of the east side of the Green Mountains and one resided on the west side, and the governorship and lieutenant governorship alternated between residents of the east and west side. Nominees for governor and lieutenant governor were originally allowed two one-year terms, and later one two-year term. For nearly 100 years, likely Republican candidates for office in Vermont agreed to abide by the Mountain Rule in the interests of party unity. Several factors led to the eventual weakening of the Mountain Rule, including the long time political dispute between the Proctor (conservative) and Aiken–Gibson (liberal) wings of the party; primaries rather than conventions to select nominees; the direct election of U.S. Senators; and several active third parties, including the Progressives, the Prohibition Party, and the Local Option movement. In the 1960s, the rise of the Vermont Democratic Party and the construction of Interstate 89 also contributed to the end of the Mountain Rule. Though I-89 is a north-south route, it traverses Vermont from southeast to northwest for the majority of its length within the state and changed the way residents view how it is divided.

List

As the independent Vermont Republic

As a U.S. state

Political party
 (6)
 (6)
 (3)
 (1)
 (2)
 (54)
 (8)

References

Vermont
Governors